Jacob Andrew Joseph LaTurner (born February 17, 1988) is an American politician serving as the U.S. representative for Kansas's 2nd congressional district. A member of the Republican Party, LaTurner was the 40th Kansas State Treasurer from 2017 to 2021 and a state senator from the 13th district from 2013 to 2017.

Upon his appointment as Kansas State Treasurer by Governor Sam Brownback, LaTurner became the youngest statewide official in the country. He was elected to the post in his own right in 2018, becoming the youngest elected statewide official in the United States. He defeated incumbent U.S. Representative Steve Watkins in the primary election, amid corruption allegations against Watkins, and won the general election against Topeka mayor Michelle De La Isla.

Early life and education 

LaTurner was born and raised in Galena, Kansas. He graduated from Galena High School and enrolled at Pittsburg State University, where he earned his undergraduate degree in political science. LaTurner worked for former Kansas Treasurer and Congresswoman Lynn Jenkins during his time in college in her Pittsburg district office.

Kansas Senate 

After losing the 2008 District 13 primary election to Republican Senator Bob Marshall, he defeated Marshall in a 2012 rematch. At age 24, he became the youngest member of the Kansas Senate. As a senator, LaTurner drafted legislation that would impose term limits on state legislators, reform the process for requesting public records, and combat potential nepotism. He faced opposition on these issues, including from Speaker of the Kansas House of Representatives Ray Merrick, a Republican, and Senate Democratic Leader Anthony Hensley.
 
In February 2015, LaTurner was the lead sponsor of legislation allowing Kansas adults to carry firearms without a concealed carry permit. In 2016, he authored a bill limiting property tax increases.

State Treasurer of Kansas 

LaTurner was appointed Kansas State Treasurer in April 2017 by Governor Sam Brownback. Appointed at age 29, LaTurner became the youngest statewide official in the country. Defeating state senator Marci Francisco in 2018, he became the youngest statewide elected official in the country.

As state treasurer, one of LaTurner's primary responsibilities was to oversee unclaimed property, over which there is over $350 million worth in Kansas. He completed a 105 County Tour within 5 months during his first year in office, and returned over $10 million during the tour. During LaTurner's first year in office, he returned a record amount of unclaimed property to Kansans, over $25.5 million. "Every dollar we return to the people of Kansas is a dollar that goes back into their local communities," LaTurner said. "Not only have we returned a record amount of money to Kansans, but we have made the process more user friendly and we have improved the service offered to Kansans."

LaTurner also administered the Kansas Learning Quest 529 Education Savings and ABLE Savings Programs, which assist Kansans in saving for their future. During his first year in office, he implemented changes to the Kansas Learning Quest and ABLE Savings Programs. Under these changes, individuals living with a disability are able to roll over saved funds within a 529 Education Savings Account into their ABLE Account. Additionally, Learning Quest 529 Education Savings Account holders can utilize their funds for K-12 education tuition.

In December 2020, Governor Laura Kelly announced that she would appoint Lieutenant Governor Lynn Rogers to succeed LaTurner as treasurer. Rogers took office on January 2, 2021.

LaTurner v. United States 

As Kansas Treasurer, LaTurner continued a legal case against the United States Department of the Treasury which requested the federal government return the proceeds from matured bonds to Kansas. Though a judge in a lower court sided with the state of Kansas, requiring the federal government to return approximately $150 million in savings bonds to the state of Kansas, the United States Court of Appeals overturned that decision and found in favor of the federal government. The bonds will still be returned to Kansans, but that process will be overseen at the federal, rather than state, level.

2020 U.S. Senate campaign

On January 8, 2019, LaTurner announced his candidacy for the United States Senate in the 2020 election, hoping to succeed four-term incumbent Pat Roberts. LaTurner's announcement came roughly two weeks after Roberts announced his intention to retire in 2021. LaTurner announced his candidacy at age 30, the minimum age the United States Constitution requires a Senator to be. As LaTurner's next election as State Treasurer would not be until 2022, the Senate campaign was considered relatively low-stakes. Campaigning as a conservative, he supported the proposed Trump wall, an expansion of the physical barrier along the Mexico–United States border, argued for fiscal responsibility, and supported term limits for federally elected politicians. Responding to questions at a meeting with five locals at the Garden City library, he said Representative Alexandria Ocasio-Cortez "thinks that the government can fix all of our problems for us and doesn't think that individuals have rights, naturally." "I think that what I believe in, and it's what our founders believed in, is that our rights come from God, not from the government... We need to continue to send people to Washington, D.C., that aren't afraid to stand up with President Trump and defend conservative principles."

LaTurner stated in several interviews that he would step aside and drop out of the race if United States Secretary of State Mike Pompeo opted to run for the seat. In one interview, LaTurner stated that he would be the "first to support [Pompeo]," while in another he said Pompeo had "right up to the last minute. He can decide to run."

On September 9, 2019, LaTurner suspended his candidacy for the U.S. Senate, opting instead to run for the U.S. House in the 2020 election.

U.S. House of Representatives

Elections

2020 

While LaTurner was running his Senate campaign, incumbent Republican Representative for  Steve Watkins was becoming embattled in several controversies, including that he inflated his business resume, was not present for important votes, voting fraud and allegations of sexual misconduct. Watkins and his staff had edited his Wikipedia page to remove content relating to the controversies. Many speculated Watkins was planning on resigning prior to the end of his term, which he adamantly denied. Watkins was charged with interference with law enforcement, providing false information; voting without being qualified; unlawful advance voting; and failing to notify the DMV of change of address. In response, former Governor of Kansas Jeff Colyer publicly encouraged LaTurner to consider challenging Watkins for the seat.

LaTurner announced he would end his Senate campaign in order to challenge Watkins on September 4, 2019. In an interview with Politico, LaTurner said, "At the end of the day, we don't want to see another congressional seat be turned over to the Democrats in Kansas...Congressman Watkins, without question, puts this seat in jeopardy this cycle." Watkins had been elected in 2018 by a margin of less than 1%. LaTurner was able to move $470,000 cash on hand from his Senate campaign to his House campaign, giving him a large advantage over Watkins who had only $260,000 at the time of LaTurner's announcement. On August 4, 2020, LaTurner defeated Watkins in the Republican primary to run against Democratic Topeka Mayor Michelle De La Isla in the November 3 general election.

Tenure 
On January 6, 2021, during the United States Electoral College vote count for the 2020 presidential elections, LaTurner voted in favor of sustaining the objection raised against Arizona's electoral votes after the session was earlier suspended when Trump supporters stormed and occupied the Capitol. Before the session concluded, he had to withdraw in quarantine because of a positive COVID-19 test, and thus was not able to vote on the objection to Pennsylvania's electoral votes. LaTurner voted against impeaching Trump in the following days.

Committee assignments 

 Committee on Homeland Security
Subcommittee on Cybersecurity, Infrastructure Protection and Innovation
Subcommittee on Intelligence and Counterterrorism
 Committee on Oversight and Reform
Subcommittee on Government Operations
 Committee on Science, Space, and Technology
Subcommittee on Research and Technology

Caucus memberships 

 Republican Study Committee

Electoral history

Primary results

General election

References

External links 

Representative Jake LaTurner official U.S. House website
 Campaign website
State Senate website
 
Follow the Money

|-

|-

|-

1988 births
21st-century American politicians
Candidates in the 2020 United States elections
Republican Party Kansas state senators
Living people
People from Galena, Kansas
Pittsburg State University alumni
Republican Party members of the United States House of Representatives from Kansas
State treasurers of Kansas
Conservatism in the United States